The River Clyst is a river of Devon, England. The name derives from Old English, and translates as Clean-stream (the Welsh name of Clydach, has similar origins).  The river lends its name to several settlements on its route, Clyst Honiton, Clyst St Lawrence, Clyst St George, and Broadclyst. The William part of Clyst William derives from the Old English of aewelm, which means river source.

From there, the river goes southward through Broadclyst, West Clyst, Clyst Honiton, Clyst St. Mary and Clyst St. George, eventually flowing into the Exe estuary at Bowling Green Marsh, immediately south of the port of Topsham near Exeter.

In 2011 work started on a new cycle and pedestrian bridge crossing the River Clyst at Fishers Mill, Topsham, forming part of the Sustrans’ National Cycle Network [NCN]. The bridge feeds into the Exe Estuary Trail, part of NCN2, and was opened in November 2013. The new bridge is downstream from an existing narrow grade II listed masonry highway bridge.

In winter, the flood plain attracts large flocks of Brant geese and Canada geese. On the north side of the Clyst, just west of the Exmouth railway line, is Bowling Green Marsh, a small RSPB reserve with a hide (SX971877). In 1988, a spill of diesel oil into the estuary threatened the habitat and the birds in the area around the river mouth. Special booms and pumps were brought in to remove the  spill. A 1994 survey of fish species in the river determined that it contained bullhead, dace, eel, minnow, stone loach, stickleback, mullet and flounder. The only salmonids were some trout in one of the tributaries. By 2008, concerns were being raised about the quality of the water citing a high level of pollution.

References

External links 
 Topsham Birdwatching & Naturalist Society

Rivers of Devon
1Clyst